Callambulyx kitchingi is a species of moth of the family Sphingidae. It is known from China.

References

Callambulyx
Moths described in 1996